Coleusia signata is a species of crab from the family Leucosiidae which is found in the Red Sea and the western Indian Ocean and which has colonised the eastern Mediterranean Sea by Lessepsian migration through the Suez Canal.

References

Crabs
Crustaceans described in 1875